Phymorhynchus agina is an extinct species of sea snail, a marine gastropod mollusk in the family Raphitomidae.

Description

Distribution
This marine species has been found in Pliocene strata of Charco Azul, Panama

References

 Olsson, Axel Adolf. "Tertiary and Quaternary fossils from the Burica Peninsula of Panama and Costa Rica." (1942): 153–258.

agina
Gastropods described in 1942